Zevenkamp is a neighbourhood in the borough Prins Alexander, Rotterdam.

History
The City of Rotterdam, Netherlands acquired the about 540 acres in 1978, in a land exchange with Capelle aan den IJssel and Zevenhuizen. Until then, the area was a rural polder.

Neighbourhoods of Rotterdam